is a retired Japanese professional pitcher.

External links

Living people
1965 births
Baseball people from Tokushima Prefecture
Japanese baseball players
Nippon Professional Baseball pitchers
Yomiuri Giants players
Japanese baseball coaches
Nippon Professional Baseball coaches